Valdeci Basílio da Silva (born 14 July 1972) is a Brazilian former football player.

Club statistics

References

External links

1972 births
Living people
Brazilian footballers
Brazilian expatriate footballers
Coritiba Foot Ball Club players
Sociedade Esportiva Palmeiras players
Associação Atlética Ponte Preta players
Grêmio Foot-Ball Porto Alegrense players
Santos FC players
Itumbiara Esporte Clube players
Kashiwa Reysol players
Tokyo Verdy players
Expatriate footballers in Japan
J1 League players
J2 League players
Associação Atlética Internacional (Bebedouro) players
Association football forwards
People from Andradina